The 2007 NCAA Division I men's soccer tournament was a tournament of 48 teams from NCAA Division I who played for the NCAA Championship in soccer. The College Cup for the final four teams was held at SAS Soccer Park in Cary, North Carolina. All other games were played at the home field of the higher-seeded team. The final was held on December 16, 2007.

In the final, Wake Forest defeated Ohio State, 2–1, with second-half goals scored by Marcus Tracy and Zach Schilawski.  This was Wake Forest's first NCAA title in men's soccer and eighth overall.

The tournament began on November 23, 2007. The first round was played on November 23 and 24, and the second round on the November 28. The third round was played on December 1 and 2. The Regional Finals were played on December 7 and 8.

Regional 1

Regional 2

Regional 3

Regional 4

College Cup – SAS Soccer Park, Cary, North Carolina

Results

First round

Second round

Third round

Quarterfinals

College Cup

Semifinals

Championship

Statistics

Goalscorers
4 goals

 O'Brian White — Connecticut

3 goals

 Yan Klukowski — Central Connecticut State
 Bryan Hogan — Massachusetts
 Andrew Magill — Ohio State
 Marcus Tracy — Wake Forest

2 goals

 Stephen Brust — Bradley
 Chris Cutshaw — Bradley
 Javier Ayala-Hil — California
 Conor Smith — Central Connecticut State
 Ian Sarachan — Illinois-Chicago
 Stuart Amick — Massachusetts
 Mike DeSantis — Massachusetts
 Joseph Lapira — Notre Dame
 Xavier Balc — Ohio State
 Eric Brunner — Ohio State
 Eric Edwards — Ohio State
 Ambane Emmanuel — Old Dominion
 Yohance Marshall — South Florida
 Charlie Campbell — Virginia Tech
 Patrick Nyarko — Virginia Tech
 Cody Arnoux — Wake Forest
 Zack Schilawski — Wake Forest

1 goal

 Alejandro Bedoya — Boston College
 Derek Puerta — Boston U
 Justin Bigelow — Bradley
 Drew DeGurian — Bradley
 Kevin Davies — Brown
 Andrew Jacobson — California
 Andrew Wiedeman — California
 Andrew Cooper — Central Connecticut State
 Johan Rundquist — Central Connecticut State
 Glenn Volk — Colgate
 Dori Arad — Connecticut
 Chukwudi Chijindu — Connecticut
 Akeem Priestley — Connecticut
 Tim Bohnenkamp — Creighton
 Andrei Gotsmanov — Creighton
 Mo Travis — Creighton
 Dan Keat — Dartmouth
 Haris Cekic — Furman
 Chris Davis — Furman
 Andre Akpan — Harvard
 John Stamatis — Harvard
 Mike Giffin — Illinois-Chicago
 Kevin Stoll — Illinois-Chicago
 John Mellencamp — Indiana
 Frank Jonke — Louisville
 Phil Bannister — Loyola (Maryland)
 Eddie Dines — Loyola (Maryland)
 Omar Gonzalez — Maryland
 Rodney Wallace — Maryland
 Michael Jejna — Massachusetts
 Prince Ofosu — Massachusetts
 Doug DeMartin — Michigan State
 Dave Donohue — Notre Dame
 Alex Yoshinaga — Notre Dame
 Piotr Nowak — Oakland
 Endre Osnes — Oakland
 Stefan St. Louis — Oakland
 Roger Espinoza — Ohio State
 Geoff Marsh — Ohio State
 A. J. Kulp — Old Dominion
 Braulio Constantino — Saint Peter's
 Matt Hatzke — Santa Clara
 Stephen McCarthy — Santa Clara
 Babajide Ogunbiyi — Santa Clara
 Bruno Guarda — SMU
 Jason Devenish — South Florida
 Todd Goddard — Tulsa
 Ashley McInnes — Tulsa
 Quincy Amarikwa — UC Davis
 Jon Curry — UC Santa Barbara
 Alfonso Motagalvan — UC Santa Barbara
 Nick Perera — UC Santa Barbara
 Kyle Nakazawa — UCLA
 Mike Zaher — UCLA
 Connor Tobin — Vermont
 Ross LaBauex — Virginia
 Dane Murphy — Virginia
 Chris Tierney — Virginia
 Joe Nason — Virginia Tech
 Austin da Luz — Wake Forest
 Julian Valentin — Wake Forest
 Ely Allen — Washington
 Dan Stratford — West Virginia
 Andrew Wright — West Virginia

Own goals

 Eric Brunner — Ohio State (playing against UC Santa Barbara)

References

NCAA Division I Mens Soccer
NCAA Division I Men's Soccer Tournament seasons
NCAA Division I men's soccer tournament
NCAA Division I men's soccer tournament
NCAA Division I men's soccer tournament